The umbilicus of a shell is the axially aligned, hollow cone-shaped space within the whorls of a coiled mollusc shell. The term umbilicus is often used in descriptions of gastropod shells, i.e. it is a feature present on the ventral (or under) side of many (but not all) snail shells, including some species of sea snails, land snails, and freshwater snails.

The word is also applied to the depressed central area on the planispiral coiled shells of Nautilus species and fossil ammonites. (These are not gastropods, but shelled cephalopods.)

In gastropods
The spirally coiled whorls of gastropod shells frequently connect to each other by their inner sides, during the natural course of its formation. This results in a more or less solid central axial pillar, known as the columella. The more intimate the contact between the concave side of the whorls is, the more solid the columella becomes. On the other hand, if this connection is less intense, a hollow space inside the whorls may result, with an opening to the outside at the shell's base. This opening is known as the umbilicus.

Another way of characterizing the umbilicus in gastropods is as the hole around which the inner surface of the shell is coiled, when that space is not filled by a columella.  
In species with a wide, open umbilicus, such as the heath snail (Helicella itala), the spiral of the whorls can be clearly viewed by looking into the umbilicus. 

An umbilicus can vary from very narrow and punctured, as found in Petasina unidentata, to wide and shallow, such as the deep and wide depression in the rounded snail (Discus rotundatus). Shells with a conspicuous umbilicus are always orthostylic, i.e. they have a poorly developed columella. 

Sometimes there is a dimple or funnel-shaped depression, known as the umbilical region or the umbilical field, next to or at the basal hollow of the columella, when the walls of successive whorls are not closely wound against each other.

A phaneromphalous shell has an open umbilicus. A cryptomphalous shell has the opening of the umbilicus completely plugged.

In cephalopods

References

External links
 Dictionary definition
 Shows the position of the umbilicus on an apple snail

Mollusc shells
Cephalopod zootomy